Who Are You (Who Are You – ,  Who Are You: She Is Another Me) is a 2020 Thai television series starring Tipnaree Weerawatnodom (Namtan), Perawat Sangpotirat (Krist) and Kay Lertsittichai. An adaptation of the South Korean drama Who Are You: School 2015, the series follows a pair of identical twins, one orphaned and constantly suffering from bullying, and the other living a better life with her rich adoptive mother.
 
Directed by Kanittha Kwunyoo and produced by GMMTV together with Nar-ra-tor, the series was one of the twelve television series for 2020 showcased by GMMTV during their "New & Next" event on 15 October 2019. It premiered on GMM 25 and LINE TV on 2 May 2020, airing on Saturdays and Sundays at 21:30 ICT and 23:00 ICT, respectively. The series concluded on 28 June 2020.

Synopsis
After enduring vicious bullying, orphaned student, Mind (Tipnaree Weerawatnodom), attempts to take her life in hopes of escaping her problems. Miraculously, she survives with the loss of all memory and wakes up with a new life as she takes on the identity of Meen (Tipnaree Weerawatnodom). Mind and Meen couldn't be more different, of course, besides the fact that they are identical twins. Living as Meen, Mind is granted the opportunity to meet Natee (Perawat Sangpotirat), a young swimming athlete who is Meen's close friend, and Gunkan (Kay Lertsittichai), a mischievous handsome boy at the school who later comes to help her recover her lost memories. But, as time passes, unveiling the truth causes her to feel more pain than she had ever experienced.

Cast and characters

Main 
 Tipnaree Weerawatnodom (Namtan) as Meennara Nunnithisopa (Meen) / Manita Euarak (Mind)
 Perawat Sangpotirat (Krist) as Natee (Na)
 Kay Lertsittichai as Gunkan (Gun)

Supporting 
 Ployshompoo Supasap (Jan) as Tida Traiwitsakul
 Harit Cheewagaroon (Sing) as Chaowat (Pete)
 Apichaya Saejung (Ciize) as Leila
 Juthapich Indrajundra (Jamie) as Arisara (Kat)
 Nuttawut Jenmana (Max) as Teacher Q
 Mayurin Pongpudpunth (Kik) as Kwan
 Meen's mother
 Alysaya Tsoi (Alice) as Teacher May
 Songsit Roongnophakunsri (Kob) as Korn
 Gun's father / Director of Panyasorn College
 Apasiri Nitibhon (Um) as Pacharee
 Pete's mother/ President of Parent Association
 Santisuk Promsiri (Noom) as Leng
 Natee's father
 Wanwimol Jensawamethee (June) as June
 Krittanai Arsalprakit (Nammon) as Damrong (Gus)
 Napasorn Weerayuttvilai (Puimek) as Kannika (Koykaew)
 Kallaya Lertkasemsab (Ngek) as Darunee
 Tida's mother
 Surasak Chaiyaat (Noo) as Thanadol
 Tida's father
 Panadda Wongphudee (Boom) as Mew
 Gun's mother
 Kittipat Chalaruk (Golf) as Teacher An
 Thanaboon Wanlopsirinun (Na) as Coach James
 Natee's swimming coach
 Lapisara Intarasut (Apple) as Ning

Soundtracks

Reception

Thailand television ratings 
In the table below,  represents the lowest ratings and  represents the highest ratings.

 Based on the average audience share per episode.

Awards and nominations

References

External links 
 Who Are You on GMM 25 website 
 Who Are You on LINE TV
 GMMTV
 

Television series by GMMTV
2020 Thai television series debuts
2020 Thai television series endings
Thai mystery television series
GMM 25 original programming